Ambos Mundos is an album by vibraphonist Bobby Hutcherson featuring performances recorded in 1989 and released the following year on Orrin Keepnews' Landmark label.

Reception

On Allmusic, Scott Yanow observed "This Landmark session was a change of pace for vibraphonist Bobby Hutcherson, an Afro-Cuban set in which he uses an expanded group. ... Intriguing and consistently exciting music".

Track listing
All compositions by Bobby Hutcherson except where noted.
 "Pomponio" – 6:26
 "Tin Tin Deo" (Chano Pozo, Gil Fuller) – 8:34	
 "Both Worlds" – 7:01
 "Street Song" – 6:49
 "Beep d' Bop" – 5:05
 "Poema Para Ravel" – 5:55
 "Yelapa" (Eddie Marshall) – 5:40
 "Bésame Mucho" (Consuelo Velázquez, Sunny Skylar) – 6:16

Personnel
Bobby Hutcherson – vibraphone, marimba
James Spaulding – flute
Smith Dobson – piano
Randy Vincent, Bruce Forman (tracks 2 & 8) – guitar
Jeff Chambers– bass
Eddie Marshall – drums
Francisco Aguabella – congas
Orestes Vilató – timbales, congas
Roger Glenn – percussion, flute

References

Landmark Records albums
Bobby Hutcherson albums
1989 albums
Albums produced by Orrin Keepnews